The Trail Making Test is a neuropsychological test of visual attention and task switching. It consists of two parts in which the subject is instructed to connect a set of 25 dots as quickly as possible while still maintaining accuracy. The test can provide information about visual search speed, scanning, speed of processing, mental flexibility, as well as executive functioning. It is sensitive to detecting cognitive impairment associated with dementia, for example, Alzheimer's disease.

History 
The test was created by Ralph Reitan, an American neuropsychologist considered one of the fathers of clinical neuropsychology. The test was used in 1944 for assessing general intelligence, and was part of the Army Individual Test of General Ability. In the 1950s researchers began using the test to assess cognitive dysfunction stemming from brain damage, and it has since been incorporated into the Halstead-Reitan battery. The Trail Making Test is now commonly used as a diagnostic tool in clinical settings. Poor performance is known to be associated with many types of brain impairment, in particular frontal lobe lesion.

Method and interpretation
The task requires a subject to connect a sequence of 25 consecutive targets on a sheet of paper or computer screen, in a similar manner to a child's connect-the-dots puzzle. There are two parts to the test: in the first, the targets are all numbers from 1 to 25 and the test taker needs to connect them in sequential order; in the second part, the dots go from 1 to 13 and include letters from A to L. As in the first part, the patient must connect the dots in order while alternating letters and numbers, as in 1-A-2-B-3-C..., in the shortest time possible without lifting the pen from the paper. . If the subject makes an error, the test administrator corrects them before the subject moves on to the next dot.

The goal of the test is for the subject to finish both parts as quickly as possible, with the time taken to complete the test being used as the primary performance metric. The error rate is not recorded in the paper and pencil version of the test, however, it is assumed that if errors are made it will be reflected in the completion time. If the patient makes a mistake, the person administering the test tells them immediately and the patient is allowed to correct it. These mistakes affect scoring only if the time taken to correct them occurs within the time it takes to complete the task as a whole.  The second part of the test, in which the subject alternates between numbers and letters, is used to examine executive functioning. The first part is used primarily to examine cognitive processing speed.

Score
Scoring is based on time taken to complete the test (e.g. 35 seconds yielding a score of 35) with lower scores being better. Different norms are available that allow comparison with age-matched groups.

Time to complete
The entire test usually takes between 5 and 30 minutes. The average times to complete part A and B are 29 and 75 seconds, respectively. It is not necessary to continue the test if a patient cannot complete parts A and B within 5 minutes.

Population and usefulness
The population to be assessed includes adolescents, adults and the elderly.

The usefulness of this test in 1944 was to assess general intelligence, but in the 1950s researchers began to use it to assess cognitive dysfunction resulting from brain damage. It is now used as a diagnostic tool in clinical settings. It can also detect cognitive impairment associated with dementia.

References

Further reading

External links
PEBL Test Battery A free computer-based research-oriented implementation of the trail-making test is available as part of the PEBL Project

Neuropsychological tests
Cognitive tests